Linalool dehydratase (linalool hydro-lyase (myrcene-forming)) is an enzyme with systematic name (3S)-linalool hydro-lyase (myrcene-forming). This enzyme catalyses the following chemical reaction

 (3S)-linalool  myrcene + H2O

In absence of oxygen this enzyme can also catalyse the isomerization of (3S)-linalool to geraniol.

References

External links 
 

EC 4.2.1